Stade Jos Haupert is a football stadium in Niederkorn, in southwestern Luxembourg.  It is currently the home stadium of FC Progrès Niederkorn.  The stadium has a capacity of 2,800.

References

World Stadiums - Luxembourg

FC Progrès Niederkorn
Jos Haupert
Jos Haupert